The Noah McCarn House is a historic house on Arkansas Highway 5, about  southeast of Mountain View, Arkansas.  It is a single-story wood-frame structure, with a side gable roof, weatherboard siding, and a stone foundation.  The main facade has a center entrance, with paired sash windows on either side, and is sheltered by a hip-roof porch supported by square posts.  The roof lines exhibit a vernacular Craftsman version of exposed rafter ends and brackets.  A wellhouse on the property has distinctive latticework walls.

The house was listed on the National Register of Historic Places in 1985.

See also
National Register of Historic Places listings in Stone County, Arkansas

References

Houses on the National Register of Historic Places in Arkansas
Houses completed in 1920
Houses in Stone County, Arkansas
National Register of Historic Places in Stone County, Arkansas